Cocaine Mafia is a collaborative mixtape by rappers French Montana, Juicy J and Project Pat. The mixtape was announced in mid 2010, and released on December 19, 2011. It features guest appearances from DJ Paul, Chinx Drugz, Gucci Mane and Akon.

Background 

On July 14, 2010, New York rapper French Montana informed XXL magazine that he had recently finished recording with Memphis-based veteran rappers Three 6 Mafia, and they would be releasing a collaborative record soon. According to French, rapper Juicy J was the one who reached out to him. "I felt honored. So after that me and Juicy J kicked it and we just ended up doing a whole album." On January 31, 2011, French revealed to MTV News that his recent hit single "Choppa Choppa Down" which featured Waka Flocka Flame, from the past year's Coke Boys mixtape, was originally intended to be a collaboration between him and Juicy J and Project Pat. Cocaine Mafia was released on December 19, and would be Juicy J's fourth mixtape that year and French Montana's third.

Critical reception 

Cocaine Mafia received mixed reviews from music critics. Sowmya Krishnamurthy of HipHopDX criticized the record for being underwhelming stating "this is a joint that needed a bit more rumination before release." However, Tom Breihan of Stereogum praised the mixtape, complimenting French's delivery stating his "sleepy-eyed monotone delivery sounds pretty amazing on chaotic Southern fight-music [...] like the calm in the middle of the storm", and noted a relaxed and darker Juicy J compared to his more party oriented releases of earlier that year.

Track listing

References

External links 
Music videos
 Is You Kiddin Me?
 Money, Weed, Blow

2011 mixtape albums
French Montana albums
Collaborative albums